David Mac Cerbaill (also called MacCarwill or MacCarwell), O.Cist (died 1289), was Archbishop of Cashel from 1254 until his death.

He was by all accounts a quarrelsome, arrogant and assertive man, who clashed with most of the leading Irish political figures of his time. He is best remembered for his unsuccessful efforts to replace the native Irish system of Brehon law with the English common law, by means of the purchase by the Irish authorities, for a considerable sum of money, of the common law system from the English Crown. It has been argued that this attempt shows him, despite his faults, to have been a sincere legal reformer.

Career 

He came from a leading Gaelic family from County Tipperary, who had a strong ecclesiastical connection. His family, according to his own statement, founded Jerpoint Abbey in the later twelfth century. Little is known of his parents or his early life, but he was Dean of Cashel at the time of his elevation to the episcopal see in August 1254. King Henry III of England opposed his appointment, on the ground that he was known to be friendly with "the King's enemies", some of whom were MacCerbaill's own relatives, but this plea was overruled by Pope Innocent IV. To secure his position with the English Crown, Mac Cerbaill went to England in 1255 and did homage to the King at Winchester, the first of his many visits to the Royal Court, but despite his repeated assurances of loyalty to the Crown, it does not seem that Henry or his son King Edward I of England ever fully trusted him. Apart from the question of where his loyalties lay, MacCerbaill had a practice of consecrating bishops without asking for the King's consent, which naturally irritated the monarch.

He joined the Cistercian Order in 1269, and while he imposed strict discipline on the Cistercian monks within his Archdiocese, he also did much to restore the fortunes of their Order, which had fallen into decay in Ireland in recent decades. He re-founded Hore Abbey near Cashel as a Cistercian house in 1270, with the approval of his superiors, who also acceded to his request, made in General Chapter, that all the Irish houses, popularly known as "the daughters of Mellifont" (Mellifont Abbey being the Irish mother house) should in the future be free from English control.

His support for the Cistercians was matched by his hostility to the Benedictine Order. According to a colourful story, his dislike of the Benedictines sprang from a dream he had in which they tried to murder him. In fact, it is simply evidence of his turbulent nature: he also quarrelled in the 1260s with his successor as Dean of Cashel, Keran (or Kyran), who accused him of cruelly ill-treating the clergy of the  Archdiocese, and of despoiling the deanery. Kyran was so harassed that he appealed to the protection of the Pope, who commended him to the care of King Edward of England. Later the Archbishop clashed with the entire Dublin administration, whom he excommunicated in 1275 in a trivial dispute over whether the Crown authorities or the Archbishop should have the governance of the new gaol in Cashel. After outraged protests from his opponents, in particular from Fromund Le Brun, the Lord Chancellor of Ireland, a compromise was reached in 1277 by which the Archbishop was given control of the gaol, but his opponents were judged to be blameless. He attended the final session of the Second Council of Lyon in 1274.

His attempt to introduce the common law system in Ireland 

It may have been an effort to bring about a reconciliation between himself and King Edward which led Mac Cerbaill to propose that the common law be imported into Ireland in return for the payment of a substantial sum of money to the King. The Archbishop first proposed this when he met Edward I France in 1274, and negotiations dragged on into the early 1280s, during which time the Archbishop lived mostly in England. It has been suggested that he had a genuine desire to abolish what he described as "the evil Irish law", which undoubtedly contained much that was objectionable to the Church, especially as regards the law of marriage, and to replace it with a system which was more closely aligned with Church teaching. 

A price of 7000 marks was agreed for the introduction of the new legal system (a mark was reckoned as two-thirds of a pound sterling), later raised to 10000 marks, which has been rightly described as "a huge sum in terms of the resources of Ireland". The project ultimately came to nothing. The Dublin administration was utterly indifferent to the proposal, there were obvious difficulties with collecting so vast a sum, despite the Archbishop's best efforts, and the King may have had doubts about its feasibility, particularly, as his biographer suggests, if the price was whittled down to the point where it meant that the Irish would get the benefits of the common law for free.

Death 

Mac Cerbaill, quarrelsome to the last, was engaged in a dispute with his fellow bishops when he died in late July or early August 1289. He was buried in Hore Abbey, the ruins of which still exist.

Sources
Breen, Aiden "MacCerbaill (MacCarwell), David" Cambridge Dictionary of Irish Biography
Cotton, Henry (1851) Fasti Ecclesiae Hibernicae: The Succession of the Prelates and Members of  the Cathedral Bodies  of Ireland Volume 1 (2nd edition). Dublin: Hodges and Smith 
Otway-Ruthven, A.J. A History of Medieval Ireland Barnes and Noble reissue New York 1993
Prestwich, Michael  Edward I University of California Press 1988

Notes

Archbishops of Cashel
1289 deaths
People from County Tipperary